Saro Shah or Saro is a town and union council in the Mardan District of Khyber-Pakhtunkhwa. The name of this town is derived from a bird known as sare. Saro Shah is about 5 km from Takht Bhai (or Takht Bahi) which is a Buddhist monastic complex dating to the 1st century BCE. The ruins are located about 15 kilometers from Mardan in Pakistan. It is located at 34°14'9N 71°54'30E and has an altitude of 316 metres (1040 feet).>

References

Union councils of Mardan District
Populated places in Mardan District